Nikolay Dmitriyevich Genchu (born 18 December 2003) is a Russian football player who plays for FC Tver.

Club career
He made his debut in the Russian Football National League for FC Spartak-2 Moscow on 9 October 2021 in a game against FC Akron Tolyatti.

References

External links
 
 Profile by Russian Football National League
 
 

2003 births
Footballers from Moscow
Living people
Russian footballers
Russia youth international footballers
Association football defenders
FC Spartak-2 Moscow players
Russian First League players
Russian Second League players